The Icon Bar (also referred to as TIB) is a computing and technology website with a focus on the RISC OS computer operating system.

History 

The Icon Bar was founded in 2000 by Tim Fountain, Alasdair Bailey and Richard Goodwin. In 2004, co-founder Richard Goodwin was nominated for the Drobe awards for keeping the "popular forum" online. It was further developed by the same people who developed Acorn Arcade, the contents of which were incorporated in 2006. At this time, it broadened its remit to also cover alternative platforms and new technologies, while still keeping abreast of the  scene.

When Drobe closed as a news site in 2009, The Icon Bar was cited as a notable alternative and took over running the annual awards scheme for the  scene. It has been selected for inclusion by editors in at least one web directory,

Content 

The site features  articles, news, forums and other media. It also hosts a Media Watch page, where users can share any relevant items they spot in the media.

References

External links 

 

Computing websites
History of computing
RISC OS